John Madigan is a Gaelic footballer from County Laois.

At club level, Madigan usually lines out at centre half back with Ballyroan Abbey and in 2006 he captained the Ballyroan/Abbeyleix combination, Ballyroan Gaels to the Laois Senior Football Championship title.

His performances at club level earned him a call up to the Laois senior football squad from new manager, Liam Kearns.

References

Year of birth missing (living people)
Living people
Ballyroan Gaelic footballers
Laois inter-county Gaelic footballers